The women's 100 metre breaststroke competition at the 2014 Pan Pacific Swimming Championships took place on August 22 at the Gold Coast Aquatic Centre.  The last champion was Rebecca Soni of United States.

This race consisted of two lengths of the pool, both lengths being in breaststroke.

Records
Prior to this competition, the existing world and Pan Pacific records were as follows:

Results
All times are in minutes and seconds.

Heats
The first round was held on August 22, at 10:13.

B Final 
The B final was held on August 22, at 19:38.

A Final 
The A final was held on August 22, at 19:38.

References

2014 Pan Pacific Swimming Championships
2014 in women's swimming